Camp Hyrule was an annual online virtual camp that was sponsored and moderated by Nintendo of America. It first opened in the summer of 1995, and emerged as Nintendo's biggest online event. Camp Hyrule, which was usually held in August, allowed Nintendo fans to chat, play online games, and win prizes under the supervision of Nintendo employees and Nintendo Power columnists. The camp's name is named after the fictional land of Hyrule, a prominent and recurring setting in The Legend of Zelda series. The last camp was in 2007, with no plans to host another Camp Hyrule.

Background
Essentially an online simulation of a summer camp, Camp Hyrule had refined many traditional outdoor themes, such as campfires, water sports, and archery into many Java-based games. Participants were assigned to cabins, where they worked with other teammates to earn points by participating in games, Photoshop contests, and other activities. After the camp session ended, the cabin with the most points won a special prize, while runner-up cabins received other consolation prizes.

The camp was also used to promote various Nintendo-related products. In past years, some of the camp's games have revolved around 1080° Avalanche, the Game Boy Advance SP, and Donkey Konga. Additionally, the camp had a theme, related to an upcoming video game, that often prompted mini-story line. For example, in 2005, the camp's design and layout reflected the upcoming Legend of Zelda: Twilight Princess. Nintendo went to further detail to add a story line to that camp session, in which games and layouts were mysteriously vanishing at the hands of an evil force. Nevertheless, all the issues were always resolved at the camp's closing ceremony, where awards and grand prize winners were announced.

Camp Hyrule was moderated and maintained by Nintendo of America's online staff. Staff members, called counselors, were responsible for moderating their assigned cabin's message board and chat rooms, while also advocating participants to earn points. The camp's staff also sent participants daily emails pertaining to earning points or the camp's plot developments. Nintendo later turned to the NSider Forums, their official online community, in order to provide additional moderators. Camp Hyrule also had a mascot, named Stumpy, who was often seen wandering the campgrounds.

The community elements were removed from Camp Hyrule in 2007, coinciding with the closing of the NSider forums and the impending switch from in-house publication of Nintendo Power to publication by Future US, which occurred in November 2007.

Registration
Unless announced otherwise, Nintendo usually opened registration for Camp Hyrule in late July or early August. Although there was no limit as to how many users could sign up, registration was only open for one week. To register, one first needed to acquire a "My Nintendo" account (which Nintendo has since phased out to bring Club Nintendo to the US), and then visit the official Camp Hyrule website for further instructions.

The 2007 camp was open from August 13 to August 23 to all My Nintendo members, and registration was not required.

Landmarks
Camp Hyrule features several landmarks which have appeared year after year on the campgrounds:
 NOA HQ, a chatroom exclusive to Nintendo of America employees. It also serves as the camp's command center.
 Trading Post, an area where updates regarding announcements, contests, and other miscellaneous information are disseminated to users by camp counselors.
 First Aid Hut, an area which offers users technical support.
 The Amphitheater, a chatroom which hosts special events, such as interviews from Nintendo officials, and the camp's annual closing ceremony.
 Lake Webaconda, an area which features games related to water sport activities, such as fishing and boating.
 The Bonfire, usually the camp's largest "general discussion" chat room.
 Stumpy's Stable, where users can play a game in which they feed Stumpy, the camp's mascot.
 The Lost Woods, a chatroom for discussion of The Legend of Zelda series, often secretly used by the majority of the veterans from the "Trivia HQ", one of the Live Chats on the NSider forums during Camp Hyrule as a substitute place to chat. The Annual Lost Woods Trivia was also hosted here by TSA.
 Maniac's Cave, a secret chatroom inside Camp Hyrule. The Camp Maniac would occasionally come out and boot everyone out of the chatroom.
 Kirby's Mess Hall, a chat formerly called "Mess Hall" until Kirby took over. Users were virtually fed "food" and it was a general discussion chat.
 Mr. Pickle's Crib, a chat only open to NOA Shaun when he decides to use it.

History
Camp Hyrule was first held from August 15 to August 19, 1995 on AOL.
In 1997, Camp Hyrule was moved from AOL to www.nintendo.com
In 1999, Camp Hyrule moved to the more familiar "www.camphyrule.com".
Beginning with the 2000 camp, campgrounds were designed around a theme based on an upcoming console or game release. The first theme used was Majora's Mask.
In 2000, Camp Hyrule began the tradition of ending each year's camp with a disaster.
In 2002, registration quotas were finally removed due to popular request. Prior to 2002, Camp Hyrule was limited to the 500-2000 registrants, thus causing intense competition and often overloading the servers.
In 2002, a majority of the camp's themes were renamed to make the camp more Nintendo related.
In 2005, each member of the winning cabin received a free Stumpy T-shirt.
In 2006, due to glitches the closing ceremonies were delayed for two hours.
In 2006, all campers were entered into a sweepstakes to win a Wii.
In 2007, the site's administrators announced they will remove Camp Hyrule's community elements. Also, all participants in the United States were able to enter a sweepstakes to win a life-size Link statue.
The 2008 event was nonexistent.
In 2009, the Camp Hyrule page originally directed to the Nintendo.com home page, though it eventually relaunched in the archived 2007 format.

Summary of past camps

References

 
 Donald-Evans, Catherine, Summer Camp Heads to Cyberspace (Archived on May 23, 2007) (August 15, 2003), FOXNews.com, Retrieved on November 1, 2022.

External links
 Camp Hyrule

Nintendo events
Recurring events established in 1995
Recurring events disestablished in 2007